Urodeta maculata is a moth of the family Elachistidae. It is found in Namibia.

References

Endemic fauna of Namibia
Elachistidae
Moths described in 2007
Insects of Namibia
Moths of Africa